The 1934 College Football All-America team is composed of college football players who were selected as All-Americans by various organizations and writers that chose College Football All-America Teams in 1934. The nine selectors recognized by the NCAA as "official" for the 1934 season are (1) Collier's Weekly, as selected by Grantland Rice, (2) the Associated Press (AP), (3) the United Press (UP), (4) the All-America Board (AAB), (5) the International News Service (INS), (6) Liberty magazine, (7) the Newspaper Enterprise Association (NEA), (8) the North American Newspaper Alliance (NANA), and (9) the Sporting News (SN).  

No player was the unanimous choice of all nine selectors.  Quarterback Bobby Grayson of Stanford and fullback Pug Lund of Minnesota led the group with first-team designations from eight of the nine official selectors.  Dixie Howell of Alabama and Chuck Hartwig of Pittsburgh each received six official first-team designations.

Consensus All-Americans
For the year 1934, the NCAA recognizes nine published All-American teams as "official" designations for purposes of its consensus determinations. The following chart identifies the NCAA-recognized consensus All-Americans and displays which first-team designations they received.

All-American selections for 1934

Ends
 Don Hutson, Alabama (College and Pro Football Hall of Fame) (AAB; AP-1; COL; INS-1; LIB-1; NANA-2; UP-1; CSW-2; NYS-1; WC-1)
 Frank Larson, Minnesota (AP-1; COL; NANA-1; NEA-1; SN; CP-1; NYS-1)
 Jim Moscrip, Stanford (AAB; AP-2; LIB-1; NANA-2; NEA-1; UP-1; SN; CP-1; WC-1)
 Joseph Bogdanski, Colgate (AP-3; NANA-1)
 Merle Wendt, Ohio State (INS-1)
 Lester Borden, Fordham (AP-2)
 Willis Ward, Michigan (CSW-2)
 Larry Kelley, Yale (AP-3)

Tackles
 Bill Lee, Alabama (AP-1; COL; LIB-1; NANA-1; SN)
 Bob Reynolds, Stanford (AP-1; COL; INS-1; NANA-1; NYS-1)
 James Steen, Syracuse (AP-2; LIB-1; UP-1; CP-1)
 Slade Cutter, Navy (AP-3; NEA-1; SN)
 George Maddox, Kansas State (College Football Hall of Fame) (AAB; WC-1)
 Clyde Carter, SMU (UP-1)
 Cassius "Cash" Gentry, Oklahoma (NEA-1; CSW-2)
 Ed Widseth, Minnesota (College Football Hall of Fame) (INS-1)
 George Theodoratus, Washington State (NEA-1)
 Joseph Ferrara, Columbia (AP-2)
 Charles Galbreath, Illinois (AP-3)
 Phil Bengston, Minnesota (NANA-2)
 Charley Hamrick, Ohio State (NANA-2)
 Charles "Buzz" Harvey, Holy Cross (CSW-2)

Guards
 Chuck Hartwig, Pittsburgh (AAB; AP-1; INS-1; LIB-1; NANA-1; SN; CP-1; NYS-1; WC-1)
 Bill Bevan, Minnesota (AP-2; COL; LIB-1; NANA-1; SN; UP-1)
 Regis Monahan, Ohio State (AAB; AP-2; NEA-1; UP-1; CP-1; NYS-1 [t]; WC-1; CSW-2)
 George T. Barclay, North Carolina (AAB [t]; AP-1; COL; NEA-1; WC-1; CSW-2)
 Charles Mucha, Washington (AP-3; NANA-2)
 Ken Ormiston, Pittsburgh (AP-3; INS-1; NYS-1)
 Weller, Princeton (NANA-2)

Centers
 Jack Robinson, Notre Dame (AAB; AP-2; NANA-1; CSW-2; WC-1)
 Darrell Lester, TCU (College Football Hall of Fame) (AP-1; INS-1; NYS-1)
 George Shotwell, Pittsburgh (COL; NANA-2; UP-1; CP-1)
 Elmer Ward, Utah State (NEA-1)
 Ellmore Patterson, Chicago (LIB-1)
 Elwood Kalbaugh, Princeton (SN)
 Franklin Meier, Nebraska (AP-3)

Quarterbacks
 Bobby Grayson, Stanford (College Football Hall of Fame) (AAB [fb]; AP-1; COL; NEA-1; INS-1 [fb]; NANA-1; SN; UP-1; CP-1 [fb]; NYS-1; WC-1)
 Arleigh Williams, California (AP-2; INS-1)
 Ed Goddard, Washington State (LIB-1)
 Miller Munjas, Pittsburgh (AP-3; NANA-2)

Halfbacks
 Dixie Howell, Alabama (College Football Hall of Fame) (AAB [qb]; AP-2; INS-1; LIB-1; NANA-1; NEA-1; UP-1; CP-1; CSW-2; WC-1)
 Buzz Borries, Navy (College Football Hall of Fame) (AP-1; COL; NANA-2; SN; UP-1; CP-1; NYS-1)
 Bill Wallace, Rice (AP-1; COL)
 Robert Hamilton, Stanford (LIB-1)
 Jay Berwanger, Chicago (College Football Hall of Fame) (AAB; AP-2; WC-1)
 Wilcox, SMU (NEA-1)
 Duane Purvis, Purdue (NANA-2; SN)
 Richard Heekin, Ohio State (AP-3)
 Claude Simons, Jr., Tulane (AP-3)
 Jack Buckler, Army (CSW-2)

Fullbacks
 Pug Lund, Minnesota (College Football Hall of Fame) (AAB [hb]; AP-1; COL; INS-1 [hb]; LIB-1; NANA-1 [hb]-1; SN; UP-1; NYS-1 [hb]; WC-1)
 Izzy Weinstock, Pittsburgh (AP-2; NANA-1; NEA-1; CSW-2)
 Stan Kostka, Minnesota (NANA-2; NYS-1; CSW-2)
 David Smukler, Temple (AP-3)

Key
Bold = Consensus All-American
 -1 – First-team selection
 -2 – Second-team selection
 -3 – Third-team selection

Official selectors
 AAB = All-America Board
 AP = Associated Press: "Alan J. Gould, Associated Press general sports editor, selected the Associated Press All-America football team. He was assisted by his staff of writers all over the country, sports editors of member papers, and eading coaches whose co-operation he sought."
 COL = Collier's Weekly as selected by Grantland Rice
 NEA = Newspaper Enterprise Association
 INS = International News Service selected by Davis Walsh
 LIB = Liberty magazine: "Fifteen hundred and forty Intercollegiate players from 93 major universities voted, according to Norman L. Sper who conducted the selection for Liberty"
 NANA = North American Newspaper Alliance, selected "by four famous coaches: Andy Kerr, of Colgate; Dan E. McGugin, of Vanderbilt; James Phelan, of Washington; and Gus Dorais, of Detroit."
 SN = The Sporting News
 UP = United Press

Other selectors
 CP = Central Press Association
 CSW = College Sports Writers
 NYS = New York Sun
 WC = Walter Camp Football Foundation

See also
 1934 All-Big Six Conference football team
 1934 All-Big Ten Conference football team
 1934 All-Pacific Coast Conference football team
 1934 All-SEC football team
 1934 All-Southwest Conference football team

References

All-America Team
College Football All-America Teams